Prauserella halophila is a moderately halophilic bacterium from the genus Prauserella which has been isolated from soil in Xinjiang, China.

References

Pseudonocardiales
Bacteria described in 2003